Metnitz is a river of Carinthia, Austria. The Metnitz springs near the Flattnitz Pass. It is a left tributary of the Gurk north of Althofen.

References

Rivers of Carinthia (state)
Rivers of Austria